The 9th Australian Academy of Cinema and Television Arts International Awards (commonly known as the AACTA International Awards) is presented by the Australian Academy of Cinema and Television Arts (AACTA), a non-profit organisation whose aim is to identify, award, promote and celebrate Australia's greatest achievements in film and television. Awards were handed out for the best films of 2019 regardless of the country of origin, and are the international counterpart to the awards for Australian films.

The awards were handed out on 3 January 2020.

Winners and nominees

Films with multiple nominations and awards

References

External links
 The Official Australian Academy of Cinema and Television Arts website

AACTA International Awards
AACTA International Awards
AACTA Awards ceremonies
AACTA International
2019 in American cinema
AACTA Awards